Paul Ernst (born 11 September 1935) is an Austrian biathlete. He competed at the 1964 Winter Olympics and the 1968 Winter Olympics.

References

1935 births
Living people
Austrian male biathletes
Olympic biathletes of Austria
Biathletes at the 1964 Winter Olympics
Biathletes at the 1968 Winter Olympics
People from Reutte District
Sportspeople from Tyrol (state)